A USSR State Committee was a central government body within the Government of the Union of Soviet Socialist Republics. Unlike a ministry, which was responsible for the management of the country's economic and social resources within a particular field of development or activity, a state committee was acting on an inter-agency level.

State committees were not directly subordinate to the Soviet Government—rather the heads of state committees (along with ministers) formed the government (cabinet) such as the Council of People's Commissars (1922–1946), Council of Ministers (1946–1991) or the Cabinet of Ministers (1991).

List of committees
All-Union State Committee
 State Defense Committee 
 State Committee on Science and Technology
 State Committee for Standards and Product Quality Management 
 State Committee for Computer Science Informatics
 State Committee for Hydrometeorology
 State Committee for Foreign Economic Relations
 State Committee for Inventions and Discoveries

Union-Republican state committees 
 State Planning Committee 
 State Committee for Construction
 State Committee for Defense Technology
 State Committee for Metallurgy
 State Committee for Transport Construction
 State Committee for Fuel Industry
 State Committee for Material and Technical Supply
 State Committee for Labour and Social Problems
 State Committee for Prices 
 State Committee on Statistics
 State Committee on National Issues
 State Committee for Vocational and Technical Education
 State Committee on Television and Radio
 State Committee for Cinematography
 State Committee for Publishing, Printing and Book Trade
 State Committee for Forestry
 State Committee for Nature Protection
 State Committee for Physical Culture and Sport
 State Committee for Supervision over Safety Works in Industry and Atomic Energy
 Committee for State Security

See also 
State Council of the Soviet Union (August-December 1991)

References